Zharick Andrea León Villalba (born 17 November 1974) is a Colombian actress and model. She is known for her modeling work and portrayal of characters in Doña Bella, Pasión de Gavilanes, and for her leading role in Los Ajenos Fútbol Club and Decisiones: Unos ganan, otros pierden.

Biography 
Zharick Andrea León Villalba was born on 17 November 1974 in Cartagena, Colombia. Her father is part of the United States Marine Corps. She grew up in a house with a military discipline. From a young age, she became familiar with weapons, self-defense movements, Martial arts, and Kung fu. At the age of 17, she left Cartagena to move to Bogotá, combining modeling with studies in Social Communication and Journalism at the Pontifical Xavierian University.

Personal life 
In 2007, she married the Argentine Actor, Martín Karpan, whom she met in the recordings of La viuda de Blanco. In 2008, she gave birth to the couple's first child, a boy, whom they called Luciano Karpan León. The couple divorced in 2009.

In 2010, she married the Colombian commercial television producer, Nicolás Reyes. The ceremony was a shamanic ritual, on the grounds of the Tayrona National Natural Park in the Sierra Nevada de Santa Marta. The celebration lasted 15 days and only twelve people were invited. The couple divorced in February 2011.

Upon completion of her work in Graduados she decides to take a break and travels continuously with her son Luciano. In this passage, León decides to attend a Yoga workshop in the Tayrona National Natural Park in the Magdalena Department, Colombia, where she meets the Mexican yoga instructor and businessman, José Rodrigo Bonilla. In 2014,she gave birth to her second child and first child with Bonilla, whom they called Levana Bonilla León. The couple broke up in 2016.

Career

Modeling career 
She started out as a model in her teenage years. Felipe Eljach convinced her to compete in La Chica Águila, where she obtained first place.

The opportunity on television came when she was part of a modeling agency, and she was chosen to present the Non Plus Ultra magazine.

In 2004, she appeared on the cover of Colombian magazine SoHo.

By the end of 2005, she traveled to Spain again, and posed on the cover of the men's magazine Interviú.

Television career 
They proposed to her the interpretation of a character in the series Hombres. Later, she went to a casting in which she was requested and got the role of Carolina in Dos mujeres.

In 2003, she went to Miami, Florida to audition for the role of the provocative singer Rosario Montes in the Colombian series Pasión de Gavilanes.

In 2004, she starred in the novel Dora, la celadora.

In 2005, she co-starred in El baile de la Vida. In April of the same year, it was presented at the Plaza de Artes y Oficios of the Parque Forestal of Guayaquil, Ecuador, where thousands of people came to observe it.

Frontera 2006 to 2007, she was the antagonist of the television series La viuda de Blanco with Itatí Cantoral and Francisco Gattorno.

From 2007 to 2008, she was the protagonist of the television series Sobregiro de amor.

In 2010, she was the protagonist of the television series Doña Bella with Fabián Ríos,  Marcelo Buquet and Stephanie Cayo.

From 2010 to 2011, she was part of the cast of the television series  La Pola.

In 2021, it is confirmed that the actress will give life to Rosario Montes in Pasión de Gavilanes 2.

Filmography

Television

Movies

References 

Colombian actresses
Colombian female models
Colombian film actors
Colombian television actresses
Pontifical Xavierian University alumni
People from Cartagena, Colombia
1974 births
Living people